6G or 6-G may refer to:
6G (network), a cellular network technology generation
6G Mobile, a Dutch telco
Rhodamine 6G, a chemical compound and dye
6G-fructosyltransferase, an enzyme
Air Wales' IATA code
6G, the production code for the 1983 Doctor Who serial Terminus
6G Era, a generation of video game consoles

See also
G6 (disambiguation)
T-6G Texan, a model of North American T-6 Texan